Jerzy Antoni Gosiewski (born 20 November 1952 in Maków Mazowiecki) is a Polish politician. He was elected to the Sejm on 25 September 2005, getting 3782 votes in 35 Olsztyn district as a candidate from the Law and Justice party.

See also
 Members of Polish Sejm 2005-2007

External links
 Jerzy Gosiewski - parliamentary page - includes declarations of interest, voting record, and transcripts of speeches.

1952 births
Living people
People from Maków County
Members of the Polish Sejm 2005–2007
Law and Justice politicians
Movement for Reconstruction of Poland politicians
Members of the Polish Sejm 2007–2011